Cecilia Rodriguez (born June 21, 1938) is a multi-awarded Filipina actress. 

She appeared in more than 130 movies and television shows. She won four FAMAS Awards in the films Kulay Dugo ang Gabi, The Passionate Strangers, Lilet and Magnifico. She also received an award for Best Supporting Actress in the Metro Manila Film Festival for the movie Bulaklak sa City Jail. She is referred to as the industry's "fashion maverick."

Early life
Cecilia "Celia" Rodriguez was born in Bulan, Sorsogon to a Castilian-Filipino father with roots in Barcelona and a mestiza mother. She was raised in their hacienda as the youngest among eight daughters. The sisters attended Colegio de la Milagrosa, a local convent school. After high school, her father sold his abaca and copra business and the family relocated to Legaspi City. Rodriguez graduated at Centro Escolar University in the country's capital Manila with a secretarial degree.

Career
Rodriguez joined the movie industry in the late 1950s, appearing in Sa Ngalan ng Espada (1958) and Shirley, My Darling (1958). She performed in movies such as Lilet, released in 1971, Super Gee (1973), Kampanerang Kuba (1974) and Mrs. Eva Fonda, 16 (1976). Other film credits include Zoom, Zoom Superman (1973), Ang Boyfriend Kong Baduy (1975), Elektrika, Kasi Eh (1976), Star (1979), Katorse (1980), Anak (1981), Angkinin Mo Ako (1983), Ang Boyfriend Kong Kano (1983), Dapat Ka Bang Mahalin (1984), Room 69 (1984) and Bulaklak ng City Jail (1984). She was known as the campy Valentina in Darna movies.

She was included in the GMA Network TV sitcom Who's Your Daddy Now? (2007) and the romantic-comedy series I Heart You, Pare! (2011) starring Dingdong Dantes and Regine Velasquez.

Awards and nominations

Filmography

Television

Movies

References

External links

1938 births
Living people
People from Sorsogon
GMA Network personalities
Filipino film actresses
Bicolano people
20th-century Filipino actresses
21st-century Filipino actresses
Filipino television actresses
Filipino television presenters
Filipino women television presenters